Enmore Park Golf Club is a golf club set within the Quantock hills, an area of outstanding natural beauty, and in the village of Enmore within the county of Somerset in England. It has a parkland course and has a total par of 71 over a medal tee yardage of 6411 yards.

History 
The club's origins can be dated back to Easter Monday of 1906, which formed the official opening of Cannington Park Golf Club, later to become Enmore Park Golf Club. The origins of the course were not in the village of Enmore but in the village of Cannington and consisted of a 9-hole course of par 38  and length of just over 2200 yards.

In 1932 at the annual general meeting, it was decided that lengthening of the course was needed, and as this was not possible at Cannington Park, a new location had to be found. The most suitable of these locations was Enmore Park, which is the current location of Enmore Park Golf Club. It is within the parklands once held by Enmore Castle. The new 9-hole course was officially opened at 3 o'clock on 24 September 1932.

The original plans for a transition to an 18-hole golf course were laid out before the Second World War. However, only 14 holes managed to be constructed before the start of the war, and during the early war years advancements to the course were suspended. Also during this period the golf club suffered financial difficulties and was forced to sell off some of the holes and returned to a nine-hole course.

It was not until 16 May 1972 that Enmore Park managed to obtain a capacity 18-hole golf course, which was officially opened on 10 June of the same year.

Competitions 
Enmore Park hosted the English Women's Amateur Stroke Play Championship in 2009.

Enmore Park along with Burnham & Berrow Golf Club was selected as the co-hosts of the 2011 R&A Boys Amateur Championship which was played between 9 and 14 August.

The course

Card of the course

Course record 
The medal course record from the white tees is currently held at a gross 62, 9 under par and was set by Taylor Stote in 2018.

References 

Golf clubs and courses in Somerset